The MGM Music Hall at Fenway is a music venue in the Fenway–Kenmore neighborhood of Boston, Massachusetts, United States was opened on August 29, 2022. On September 28, 2018, the Fenway Sports Group (FSG) announced plans to build a 5,000 seat music venue in place of a surface parking lot next to Fenway Park. FSG partnered with Live Nation Entertainment to host shows at the venue. The second level of the venue is named the Curve Level after their sponsor Curve.

References

Buildings and structures in Boston
Theatres in Boston
Music venues in Boston
Music venues completed in 2022
2022 establishments in Massachusetts